Christian Vander may refer to:

Christian Vander (musician) (born 1948), French drummer and founder of the band Magma
Christian Vander (footballer) (born 1980), German football player